Maude Kaufman Eggemeyer (December 9, 1877 – December 1, 1959) was an early 20th Century painter associated with the Richmond Group of artists in Richmond, Indiana.

She was born in New Castle, Indiana in 1877, the daughter of architect William S. Kaufman. She studied first under her father's instruction and then under John Elwood Bundy at Earlham College, under Frank Duveneck and Lewis Henry Meakin at the Art Academy of Cincinnati (where she received a scholarship in 1904) and with the Overbeck Sisters in Cambridge City, Indiana. She also studied with J. Ottis Adams at the Hermitage in Brookville, Indiana.

Eggemeyer was a versatile painter and is best known for her oil paintings of backyard gardens and of still life scenes. She married Elmer Eggemeyer the postmaster of Richmond, Indiana and painted in the studio of their home at South 18th and A Streets in Richmond which she helped her father design. She also painted in Provincetown, Massachusetts where the Eggemeyers had a summer home. Elmer killed himself in 1931 and she stopped painting about that time. She died in 1959 in Asheville, North Carolina at the home of her sister where she had gone to live.

Today her paintings are held in a number of private collections and museums, including the Haan Mansion Museum of Indiana Art, Richmond Art Museum, Indiana State Museum and the Louise and Alan Sellars Collection of Art by American Women in Indianapolis. She is buried in the Kaufman family plot at Earlham Cemetery in Richmond, Indiana.

Sources
 Newton, Judith Vale and Carol Ann Weiss. (2004) Skirting the Issue: Stories of Indiana's Historical Women Artists, Indiana Historical Society Press, Indianapolis.

External links
 Maude Eggemeyer at Waynet.org

1877 births
1959 deaths
American landscape painters
Artists from Richmond, Indiana
Burials at Earlham Cemetery, Richmond, Indiana
People from New Castle, Indiana
20th-century American painters
American women painters